Soldier Creek Dam is an earthen dam on the Strawberry River, located within the Uinta National Forest in southern Wasatch County, Utah, United States.

Description
The dam forms Strawberry Reservoir and is a principal feature of the Strawberry Valley Project, part of the Bonneville Unit of the Central Utah Project. The dam and reservoir were built and operated by the United States Bureau of Reclamation (USBR).

Constructed between 1970 and 1974, the dam replaced the earlier Strawberry Dam, built slightly upstream of the current site from 1911–1913. The primary purpose of the dam is to store flows from the upper Strawberry River, as well as water diverted from eight tributaries of the Duchesne River, for diversion through the Strawberry Tunnel to supplement water supplies in the Utah Valley. Water from the Strawberry Tunnel eventually outlets into Sixth Water Canyon, the Diamond Fork (stream) and finally the Spanish Fork (river) before flowing into Utah Lake.

See also

 List of dams and reservoirs in Utah

References

External links

Dams in Utah
Dams in the Green River (Colorado River tributary) basin
Buildings and structures in Wasatch County, Utah
Embankment dams
United States Bureau of Reclamation dams
Dams completed in 1974